Ernst Schulze may refer to:

 Ernst Schulze (poet), a German Romantic poet
 Gottlob Ernst Schulze, a German philosopher
 Ernst Schulze (chemist), a German Chemist and the grandson of Gottlob Ernst Schulze
 Sadananda, born Ernst-Georg Schulze, a German Gaudiya Vaishnavist swami